Mick Ryan may refer to:

 Mick Ryan (Australian footballer) (1882–1957), Australian rules footballer for Collingwood
 Mick Ryan (Gaelic footballer) (born 1946), Irish retired Gaelic footballer
 Mick Ryan (golfer) (1897–1965), Australian amateur golfer
 Mick Ryan (hurler) (1925–2007), Irish hurler
 Mick Ryan (Borris–Ileigh hurler) (born 1960), Irish hurler
 Mick Ryan (politician) (1884–1970), Australian politician
 Mick Ryan (racehorse trainer) (1941–2022), British racehorse trainer
 Mick Ryan (rower) (born 1947), Irish Olympic rower
 Mick Ryan (rugby league) (born 1953), Australian rugby league footballer
 Mick Ryan (general), Commander, Australian Defence College 2018

See also
Michael Ryan (disambiguation)